[] is a quarter of Hamburg, Germany, belongs to the borough Harburg. The quarter consists of the old settlements Neugraben and Fischbek, and the more recently constructed area Neuwiedenthal.

History

History of Fischbek
Fischbek was first mentioned in 1544 as Vischbecke. In 1937 the independent village Fischbek was merged into Hamburg.

History of Neugraben 

In 1937 the independent village of Neugraben was merged into Hamburg.

Subcamp Neugraben 
In Neugraben was a subcamp of the Nazi concentration camp Neuengamme. On September 13, 1944 the women subcamp was opened in Falkenbergweg.  500 Czech-Jewish women coming from the Ghetto Theresienstadt were deported to the Auschwitz concentration camp. The SS in Auschwitz selected the women for labour in Hamburg. In the Neugraben camp the work was building auxiliary homes, also laying supply pipes and building streets in the neighbourhood Falkenbergsiedlung.  During the last months of World War II, some of the women had to do clearing up work in Harburg's oil industry and to dig antitank obstacles in Hamburg-Hausbruch.  In February 1945, the SS transferred the women to the camp Hamburg-Tiefstack and later from there to the Bergen-Belsen concentration camp.

Geography
Neugraben-Fischbek is southeast of the quarter Neuenfelde, in the northeast is Francop, in the east is the quarter Hausbruch. In the south is the district Harburg of the German state Lower Saxony. A large part of the quarter is the nature reserve Harburger Berge (Hills of Harburg) in the south. Neugraben-Fischbek it a mixed rural and suburban area of 22.5 km2.

In Neugraben-Fischbek is the highest rise of Hamburg, the Hasselbrack, which reaches 116.2 metres AMSL

Demographics
In 2006 in the Neugraben-Fischbek quarter were living 27,103 people. Resident aliens were 10.1% of the population. 1,644 people were registered as unemployed.

In 1999 there were 12,170 households, out of which 27.9% had children under the age of 18 living with them and 30.5% of all households were made up of individuals. The average household size was 2.31.

Population by year

Infrastructure

Transportation 
Neugraben-Fischbek is served by the rapid transit system of the city train with the stations Neugraben and Fischbek.

See also 
 List of subcamps of Neuengamme

Notes

References

 Statistical office Hamburg and Schleswig-Holstein Statistisches Amt für Hamburg und Schleswig-Holstein, official website 
Official German list of concentration camps Verzeichnis der Konzentrationslager und ihrer Außenkommandos gemäß § 42 Abs. 2 BEG 

Parts translated from :de:Neugraben-Fischbek

External links

 Neugraben-Hausbruch Notgeld (emergency currency) webgerman.com/Notgeld/Directory/N/Neugraben.htm

Quarters of Hamburg
Neuengamme concentration camp
Harburg, Hamburg